
The Plymouth Theatre (1911–1957) of Boston, Massachusetts, was located on Stuart Street in today's Boston Theater District. Architect Clarence Blackall designed the building for Liebler & Co. Performers included Henry Jewett, Bill "Bojangles" Robinson, 8-year-old Sammy Davis, Jr., and Bette Davis. In October 1911, the touring Abbey Theatre presented Synge's Playboy of the Western World at the Plymouth; in the audience were W. B. Yeats, Isabella Stewart Gardner and Rose Fitzgerald Kennedy.

"The Shubert Organization of New York bought the Plymouth in 1927 and used it largely for tryouts of plays headed for New York or going on tour, and for some long run performances." In 1957 the building became the Gary Theater.

Images

Performances

1910s
 Synge's Playboy of the Western World
 Worral & Terry's The White Feather
 Avery Hopwood's Sadie Love, with Marjorie Rambeau
 Heart o' th' Heather, with George FacFarlane
 John Galsworthy's Justice, with John Barrymore
 Otto Hauerbach's The Silent Witness
 G.B. Shaw's Getting Married, with William Faversham and Henrietta Crosman
 The Man Who Came Back
 Booth Tarkington's Seventeen, with Gregory Kelly
 She Walked in Her Sleep
 Breakfast in Bed, with Florence Moore

1920s
 Alice Duer Miller's Charm School
 The Humming Bird, with Maude Fulton
 Charles Anthony's Pagans, with Irene Fenwick
 The Purple Mask, with Leo Ditrichstein
 Collison & Hopwood's Gertie's Garter, with Hazel Dawn
 John Galsworthy's The Skin Game
 Woman of Bronze, with Margaret Anglin
 Dog Love, with William Hodge
 Green Goddess, with George Arliss
 Ladies' Night

1930s-1950s

 Lady Precious Stream

Mademoiselle-1932-w Grace George and Alice Brady
Reflected Glory - 1936 w Tallulah Bankhead
Blow Ye Winds - 1936 w Henry Fonda with Doris Dalton
The Masque of Kings - 1936 w Henry Hill, Dudley Digges and Margo Pauline Frederick
Susan and God - 1939 w Gertrude Lawrence and Paul McGrath
Boys and Girls Together - 1940 w Ed Wynn and The De Marcos.              "Kiss and tell" - 1943 by F.Hugh Herbert with Violet Heming Walter Gilbert and Betty Anne Nyman

Notes

References

External links

 Library of Congress. Drawing of Plymouth Theatre, Eliot St. near Tremont St., Boston, Massachusetts, 1922.
 Flickr. Photo of Gary Theater, 20th century
 Bostonian Society. Photo of the Gary Theater, 127-131 Stuart Street, c. 1958
 Boston Athenaeum. Theater History: Plymouth Theatre, 131 Stuart Street

Event venues established in 1911
Former theatres in Boston
Former buildings and structures in Boston
1911 establishments in Massachusetts
1957 disestablishments in Massachusetts
Cultural history of Boston
20th century in Boston
Boston Theater District